Horwathia is a genus of bugs in the tribe Mirini, family Miridae.

Species
 Horwathia hieroglyphica (Mulsant & Rey, 1852) 
 Horwathia lineolata (A. Costa, 1862)

References 

Miridae genera
Mirini